Madre de Deus was a Portuguese treasure ship captured by English privateers in 1592.

Madre de Deus (Portuguese for Mother of God) may also refer to:

Municipalities in Brazil
 Madre de Deus, Bahia
 Madre de Deus de Minas, Minas Gerais
 Brejo da Madre de Deus, Pernambuco

Buildings and landmarks
 Monastery of Madre de Deus, a location of the National Azulejo Museum in Lisbon, Portugal
 Madre de Deus Convent, a former convent and church, now the National Museum of the Azulejo in Lisbon, Portugal
 Madre de Deus Manor, a landmark in the Azores, Portugal
 Madre de deus church vettukad, Kerala, India

Other
 Filipe da Madre de Deus (ca.1630–1688x90) Portuguese composer
 An alternate name for the Portuguese ship Nossa Senhora da Graça

See also
 Madredeus, a Portuguese musical ensemble
 Madre de Dios (disambiguation) same title in Spanish